Andrus Murumets (born 20 July 1978) is an Estonian strongman and entrant to the World's Strongest Man contest. He reached 5th in the World Rankings according to the IFSA rankings in 2008. Andrus competed in the IFSA World Championships in 2005 finishing 4th, 5th in 2006 and 5th in 2007. Andrus has competed in the Arnold Strongman Classic 3 times, his best finish was 3rd in 2007. In 2009 he became the overall champion of the Strongman Champions League. He has been described by Svend Karlsen as having the strongest grip in the world.

Murumets lives near Tallinn in Üksnurme, Saku Parish. Since May 2011 Murumets is working as a police officer.

World records
Until 2008, Farmer’s Walk world record holder at 352 lbs (160 kg) per hand on a 50m course.
World record holder: Timber Carry, 875 lbs (398 kg) / 40 pi (12,3 m) / 7,35 sec
Rolling Thunder - On 16 June 2003 he broke the world record for the Rolling Thunder one hand deadlift with a lift of 267 lb at the IFSA All Strength Challenge in Winnipeg, Manitoba. This has since been broken by Laine Snook, and is currently held by Mark Felix.

References

1978 births
Living people
People from Põlva Parish
Estonian strength athletes